The following lists events in the year 2017 in the Democratic Republic of the Congo.

Incumbents
 President: Joseph Kabila
 Prime Minister: Samy Badibanga

Events
2017: Morgan Stanley projects 1 billion electric vehicles in use globally by 2050 and 800% increase in demand for cobalt, used in electric car batteries, by 2026.
 February 2017 - Glencore agreed to pay Dan Gertler $534m (£407m) for his share of their joint mining interests in DR Congo.
 14 February 2017 – The UN reveals that Congolese soldiers had killed 101 people including 30 women while fighting the Kamwina Nsapu rebels in Kasaï-Central.
 23 March 2017 – 2017 Congolese police decapitation attacks
 22 April 2017 to 1 July 2017 – 2017 Democratic Republic of the Congo Ebola virus outbreak
 July 2017 - United Nations has documented 80 mass graves in Kasai unrest that began in August 2016
 7 August 2017 -Congolese soldiers forces killed at least 14 Bundu dia Kongo (BDK) rebels in clashes in the capital Kinshasa and southwestern city of Matadi.A policeman also died.
 16 August 2017 – 2017 DR Congo landslide
 26 August 2017 – The Democratic Republic of the Congo gubernatorial elections, 2017, are held in 11 provinces. 
 29 August 2017 – Three provinces have a second round of voting as part of the gubernatorial elections.
 6 November 2017 - details emerge in Paradise Papers reporting of a loan from Glencore to Dan Gertler in 2008 when it needed to renegotiate its agreement with state mining company Gécamines for its Katanga mine.
 7 December 2017 – 2017 Semuliki attack
 21 December 2017 – Delayed gubernatorial elections are held in three provinces (Kasaï-Central, Mongala, and Equateur).

2017 trends
2017: the price of cobalt increased 127% over the course of 2017.
2017: Congo DR produced 64,000 metric tons of cobalt.

Deaths

1 February – Étienne Tshisekedi, politician (b. 1932).

References

 
2010s in the Democratic Republic of the Congo
Years of the 21st century in the Democratic Republic of the Congo
Congo, Democratic Republic of the
Democratic Republic of the Congo